Ovaltineys or League of Ovaltineys was a children's club developed in the 1930s to promote the sale of Ovaltine brand drink in the United Kingdom.

Original Ovaltineys
The club, founded in 1935, had its own radio show, Ovaltiney's Concert Party, on Radio Luxembourg, sponsored by the manufacturer. It achieved five million members in 1939. This was a time when few people had televisions, and radio was all-important as a medium, and had huge audiences. The show was broadcast on Sunday evenings between 5.30pm and 6pm over the powerful Long Wave transmitter and the show became well known throughout the UK for its theme song We Are The Ovaltineys. Members of the club received a membership badge and book and the chance to take part in competitions and other activities. There was a weekly comic too.

Revivals

In 1952 a new version of the Ovaltineys' show was aired once more at 6:15 PM on Sunday evenings over Radio Luxembourg on its new 208 Medium Wave transmitter.

In the late 1960s the Ovaltineys' Club was relaunched and aimed at modern children and, in addition to their badge, members received a record with instrumental songs performed in a "pop" style. The presidents of the new club were the British comedy team of Morecambe and Wise. 

In 1975 the song We Are The Ovaltineys came back to a new audience when it was used by Ovaltine in a TV advertisement and released as a single record.

Theme Tune introduction

We are the Ovaltineys

Little girls and boys,

Make your request we'll not refuse you

We are here just to amuse you.

Would you like a song or story

Will you share our joys?

At games and sports we're more than keen,

No merrier children could be seen,

Because we all drink Ovaltine,

We're happy girls and boys.

Theme song - signing off lyrics

And now the happy Ovaltineys

Wish you all adieu,

But don't forget your Ovaltine

It's very good for you.

But we'll be here again next Sunday

With songs and stories new,

And so until we meet again

The Ovaltineys bid you all adieu.

References

External links
 Review of Ovaltineys club
 The Birth of Ovaltineys : Official Site

1935 establishments in the United Kingdom
Clubs and societies in the United Kingdom
Youth organizations established in 1935